Thauera linaloolentis is a gram-negative, mesophilic, motile bacterium from the genus of Thauera.

References

Bibliography

External links
Type strain of Thauera linaloolentis at BacDive -  the Bacterial Diversity Metadatabase

Rhodocyclaceae
Bacteria described in 1999